The 1958–59 Boston Bruins season was the Bruins' 35th season in the NHL.

Offseason
Claimed Jen-Guy Gendron and Gord Redahl from the New York Rangers, Earl Reibel from Chicago.
Traded Allan Stanley to Toronto for Jim Morrison.

Regular season

Final standings

Record vs. opponents

Schedule and results

Playoffs

This would be the last playoff appearance for the Bruins for the next eight seasons; the team would next make the playoffs in 1968. The Bruins lost a very close seven game semi-final series to Toronto.

After the playoffs were concluded, the Bruins and the New York Rangers embarked on a 23-game European exhibition tour which saw them play in ten European cities. Andy Bathgate of the Rangers could not make the tour so his place was taken by Bobby Hull of the Chicago Blackhawks. Hull scored 50 goals in the 23 exhibition games and blossomed into a star in the next NHL season.

Player statistics

Regular season
Scoring

Goaltending

Playoffs
Scoring

Goaltending

Awards and records

Transactions

Farm teams
 Providence Reds
 Victoria Cougars
 Quebec Aces

See also
1958–59 NHL season

References

External links

Boston Bruins seasons
Boston Bruins
Boston Bruins
Boston Bruins
Boston Bruins
1950s in Boston